Ella Enchanted: Original Soundtrack is the soundtrack to the movie Ella Enchanted which was released by Hollywood Records. The album features Kelly Clarkson, Jesse McCartney and Raven-Symoné. Anne Hathaway also performs three songs on this album including one duet with Jesse McCartney.

Promotion
In 2006, Disney made a new music video for the Disney Princess franchise to "It's Not Just Make Believe" by Kari Kimmel with footage from various Disney animated films, which was shown on the Disney Channel numerous times and featured on the Disney Princess Sing-Along Songs: Perfectly Princess DVD in Sing-Along form.

Critical reception

Heather Phares, from Allmusic said: "Though the film is technically a Miramax offering," "the soundtrack is downright Disney, gathering songs from the studio's stable of prefab teen pop singers." She praised Kelly Clarkson "out-sings them all on "Respect", which, despite its canned-sounding accompaniment, makes the most of her voice".

She concludes "Indeed, most of the Ella Enchanted soundtrack plays like a souped-up school musical, although that does give it sort of an awkward charm."

Track listing

^previously released on American Idol: Greatest Moments

Possible alternate release
Jesse McCartney and Anne Hathaway - "Don't Go Breakin' My Heart"
Kari Kimmel - "It's Not Just Make Believe"
Kelly Clarkson - "Respect"
Jump5 - "Walking On Sunshine"
Raven Symone - "True to Your Heart"
Kaci - "I Think I Love You"
Anne Hathaway - "You Make Me Feel Like Dancing" (Remix)
Anne Hathaway - "Somebody to Love"
Andrea Remanda and Bryan Adams - "If You Believe"
Darren Hayes - "Strange Magic"
Stimulator - "Magic"
The Beu Sisters - "Once Upon a Broken Heart"
Sean Devel - Score Suite

See also
Ella Enchanted (film)

References

External links
[ Ella Enchanted Original Soundtrack] at Allmusic

Fantasy film soundtracks
2004 soundtrack albums
Hollywood Records soundtracks
Pop rock soundtracks
Comedy film soundtracks